Alkerton may refer to:

Alkerton, Gloucestershire
Alkerton, Oxfordshire